Kewaunee County is a county located in the U.S. state of Wisconsin. As of the 2020 census, the population was 20,563. Its county seat is Kewaunee. The county was created in 1852 and organized in 1859. Its Menominee name is Kewāneh, an archaic name for a species of duck. Kewaunee County is part of the Green Bay, WI Metropolitan Statistical Area as well as the Green Bay-Shawano, WI Combined Statistical Area.

Fishing and boating
In 2018, Kewaunee County ranked first in the state in the Chinook salmon harvest, with 26,557 fish caught, with nearby Door County ranking second at 14,268 fish caught. Chinook salmon are sought after by tourists enjoying chartered fishing trips. 2,447 in Kewaunee County

The state record rainbow trout was set in 1997 at 27 pounds, 2 ounces and 42.5 inches long. It came from the Kewaunee County portion of Lake Michigan. In 1999 the state record pink salmon was also caught in Lake Michigan out of Kewaunee County waters. It was 6 pounds, 1.9 ounces and was 24.0 inches long. In 2005, the state record white perch was taken out of the Kewaunee County portion of Green Bay. It weighed 1 pound, 5.4 ounces and was 13.5 inches long.

Beginning in 1964, first coho and then chinook salmon were stocked in Lake Michigan. New salmon and trout fingerling stocking in the spring and egg and milt collection from late September to early November takes place at the C.D. "Buzz" Besadny Anadromous Fish Facility. The facility is a public attraction.

In recent years there has been concern that the alewife population will not support the salmon population, especially as the Chinook population has already collapsed in Lake Huron. A 2016 survey of Wisconsin anglers found they would on average pay $140 for a trip to catch Chinook salmon, $90 for lake trout, and $180 for walleye. Should the Chinook salmon fishery be replaced with a native lake trout fishery, the economic value would decrease by 80%.

A 1995 study found the greatest abundance of spawning lake trout in Lake Michigan was on the Clay Banks Reef off of Door and Kewaunee counties.

The sucker run, which was a popular fishing event in the 19th century, occurs in March and April. Suckers may be taken by frame dip nets, and the sucker run is also sought out as viewing opportunity. The smelt run also attracts fishermen.

The state recognizes 11 public boat access sites. There are 14 inland lakes or ponds in Kewaunee County. In 2012, there were 2,252 registered boats in the county. Algoma Light
and Kewaunee Pierhead Light are active navigational aids for boaters. The Daniel Lyons shipwreck near Algoma is used as a dive site, but the America near Carlton is less visited by divers due to its remote location. There are 24 other known shipwrecks in county waters. The Tug Ludington in Kewaunee is operated as a museum boat.

Parks and other lands open to the public
The county operates eight parks. The Dana Farm (childhood home of Ransom Asa Moore) was relocated to the Winter Park. Along with the Bruemmer Park and Zoo, it is located near the state-owned C.D. Buzz Besadny Fish Hatchery. Two other state-owned parks are Mashek Creek Public Access and the Brusky Wildlife Area. There are also 27 municipal parks operated by the cities of Algoma, Kewaunee, and the Village of Luxembourg.

There are four public beaches in the county, three of which are routinely monitored for water quality advisories. The county and the city of Algoma each operate one beach. Kewaunee operates two beaches, There are boardwalks along the beach in Algoma and the Kewaunee Marshland Walk. Altogether there are ten public access sites to Lake Michigan and Green Bay in the county.

Limestone kiln remnants of historical interest are open to the public at the Bruemmer Park and Zoo. Although lime is not presently produced in Kewaunee County, as of 2016, there were 9 active gravel pits producing sand and gravel for roadwork and construction use.

 of privately owned land is open to the public for hunting, fishing, hiking, sight-seeing and cross-country skiing under the Managed Forest Program.

Species lists and coastal wetlands
The four state recognized coastal wetlands in the county are the Kewaunee River Wetland Complex, the Black Ash Swamp Area, the Ahnapee River Wetlands, and the Duvall Swamp. A 1980 inventory of natural areas recognized Duvall Swamp, Alaska Bog, Krok Woods, Kewaunee River Marshes, Cosco Tamarack Woods, Broemmer Creek Headwaters, Alaska Lake, Three Mile Creek Tag Alder, Silver Lake, Krohn's Lake, and the Ahnapee River Swamps. Historically, hypnum peat was produced in the county.

Plants
In 2016, 586 plant species were listed in a checklist for the county that excluded mosses, liverworts, and hornworts. In 2020, 33 species of mosses, liverworts, and hornworts and 125 species of macrofungi (including lichens) were listed for the county. In 1999, 8 aquatic species were found in East Alaska Lake.

Snails
From 1996 to 2001, researchers listed 48 species of snails in Kewaunee County, ranking eighth out of the 22 counties in the study. Nearby Door and Brown counties ranked first and second with 69 and 62 species respectively. However, they only sampled 13 areas in Kewaunee County, compared to 74 areas in Door and 28 areas in Brown. Slugs were found in all three counties.

Birds
As of 2020, 103 species of birds have been confirmed to breed in Kewaunee County.

In 1911, passenger pigeons were seen in the Black Ash Swamp. This was one of the last reported sightings in the state.

Cattle and deer
In 2018 statistics, a county total of 3,527 deer were killed as a total of all deer hunting seasons, down from the total harvest of 3,787 deer for 2017 statistics. In 2017, Kewaunee and Door counties were reported to have equal deer-to-human ratios. Kewaunee County had the third highest cow-to-human ratio in the state, with only Lafayette and Buffalo counties having higher ratios. In 2018, there were an estimated 97,000 head of cattle in the county, more than Door County which had 23,500 head of cattle.

Foods, agritourism, and alcohol
Kewaunee County is known for its kolache. Another distinctive local food is booyah. The cooking of booyah is not exclusive to Belgians, but has also been adopted by some Czechs. Cornish apple elderberry dumplings are another local dish.

In 2017, six operations tapped 1,840 trees to produce maple syrup, down from 3,024 trees tapped by three operations in 1997.

U-pick strawberries, apples, and pumpkins are grown.

There are also two Christmas tree operations. In 2017, 4,084 Christmas trees were cut, down from 4,462 in 2012.

In 2014–15, there were 96 liquor licenses in the county. The first modern winery in the state opened in Algoma in 1967. The area was recognized as part of a larger federally designated wine grape-growing region in 2012. In 2017, there were 28 acres of vineyards, down from 34 in 2012.

Arts
Tourism supports an arts community, including papermaking, sculpture, and painting.

Crops
The most important field crops by acres harvested in 2017 were hay and haylage at 48,887 acres, corn (silage) at 37,042 acres, corn (grain) at 22,846 acres, soybeans at 15,000 acres, wheat at 9,975 acres, oats at 2,834 acres, and barley at 146 acres.

Both sale prices and rental values of agricultural land are higher than the average for Wisconsin counties. The most common USDA soil association in the county is the Hortonville–Symco association. About 51 percent of soils in this association are Hortonville and 16 percent are Symco. The remaining 33% in the association are minor soils such as Carbondale, Pella, and Kolberg. Altogether, about 34.8% of the county has Hortonville-Symco association soils. In a forested environment, Hortonville and Symco soils have an average of 7.6% and 13.2% organic matter, respectably. However, as cropland they only have tested from 2% to 3% organic matter.

Geography
The northern part of the county is on the Door Peninsula between Green Bay and Lake Michigan. The northern part of the Kettle Moraine extends into Kewaunee County. There are three named peaks in the county. The USGS monitors one well in the county on an hourly basis. It also takes hourly pictures of the field in front of the well.
It usually takes four to five hours for the groundwater level to rise after a big rain.

Adjacent counties
 Door County – north
 Manitowoc County – south
 Brown County – west
 Benzie County, Michigan – northeast across Lake Michigan
 Manistee County, Michigan – southeast across Lake Michigan

Transportation

Major highways
  Highway 29 (Wisconsin)
  Highway 42 (Wisconsin)
  Highway 54 (Wisconsin)
  Highway 57 (Wisconsin)

Rustic road and quilt trail
 There is one rustic road in the county. A quilt trail along roadside barns was organized in 2009.

Railroads
Watco

Buses
List of intercity bus stops in Wisconsin

Non-motorized
 The Ahnapee State Trail connects Kewaunee to Sturgeon Bay. The Ice Age Trail coincides with the Kewaunee County portion of the Ahnapee State Trail, and also extends further south along the East Twin River Segment. Winter snowmobile access to trails is dependent on weather and trail grooming.
 WIS 42 and 57 are part of the Lake Michigan Circle Tour.
 Riverview ATV Park includes mountain bike trails that are off limits to ATVs. It is open from May to November.

Airport
 The Rio Creek airport (also called Walter's Agri-center Airport) (WI28) is privately owned, but open to the public and includes a campground.
 The nearest international airport is the Green Bay–Austin Straubel International Airport

Demographics

2020 census
As of the census of 2020, the population was 20,563. The racial makeup of the county was 93.1% White, 0.4% Native American, 0.3% Asian, 0.3% Black or African American, 2.4% from other races, and 3.5% from two or more races. Ethnically, the population was 4.1% Hispanic or Latino of any race.

2000 census

As of the census of 2000, there were 20,187 people, 7,623 households, and 5,549 families residing in the county. The racial makeup of the county was 98.56% White, 0.15% Black or African American, 0.27% Native American, 0.13% Asian, 0.30% from other races, and 0.57% from two or more races. 0.76% of the population were Hispanic or Latino of any race. 36.4% were of German, 23.8% Belgian, 9.7% Czech, 6.3% Polish and 5.1% American ancestry.

There were 7,623 households, out of which 33.50% had children under the age of 18 living with them, 62.40% were married couples living together, 6.60% had a female householder with no husband present, and 27.20% were non-families. 23.50% of all households were made up of individuals, and 11.80% had someone living alone who was 65 years of age or older. The average household size was 2.61 and the average family size was 3.10.

In the county, the population was spread out, with 25.80% under the age of 18, 8.00% from 18 to 24, 28.20% from 25 to 44, 22.80% from 45 to 64, and 15.20% who were 65 years of age or older. The median age was 38 years. For every 100 females, there were 100.60 males. For every 100 females age 18 and over, there were 98.80 males.

Population dynamics
Between April 2010 and January 2019, there were an estimated 1,745 births and 1,605 deaths in the county. The greater number of births served to increase the population by an estimated 140 people. In addition, there were an estimated 68 more people who moved in than left. Combined, this positive net migration along with the natural increase raised the county population by an estimated 208 persons during this period. In 2013, a researcher predicted that in 2030 the county's population would peak then start to decline.

In 2017, there were 199 births, giving a general fertility rate of 61.8 births per 1000 women aged 15–44, the 33rd lowest rate out of all 72 Wisconsin counties. Additionally, there were 10 reported induced abortions performed on women of Kewaunee County residence in 2017.

Marriages
Five-year ACS data from 2012 to 2016 show that an estimated 5.2% of women aged 45–54 in the county had never been married, tying with 19 other counties in having the 697th lowest percentage of never-married women in this age bracket out of 3,130 U.S. counties reporting data. The ACS estimate also found that 76.3% of women aged 35–44 were married, tying with five other counties in having the 360th highest number of married women in this age bracket out of 3,136 counties reporting data, and that the county was tied with seven other counties in having the 552th lowest percentage of births to unmarried women out of 3,021 counties reporting data. 22.8% of births were to unmarried women.

In 2015, the county tied with Sawyer County in having the 13th fewest marriages in the state. It tied with Marquette County in having the 23th fewest divorces out of all 72 Wisconsin counties. May and October tied as the months with the most weddings, with 21 each. In 2016 the county was the 19th-least populous in the state.

Religion
In 2010 statistics, the largest religious group in Kewaunee County was the Catholics, with 10,606 adherents worshipping at St. Lawrence Catholic Church in Stangelville and six other parishes, followed by 1,622 WELS Lutherans with three congregations, 1,356 LCMS Lutherans with three congregations, 318 ELCA Lutherans with one congregation, 163 NACCC Congregationalists with one congregation, 155 United Methodists with two congregations, 119 non-denominational Christians with two congregations, 90 Converge Baptists with one congregation, 70 AoG Pentecostals with one congregation, and 27 EC-USA Episcopalians at St Agnes-by-the-Lake in Algoma. Altogether, 70.6% of the population was counted as adherents of a religious congregation. In 2014, Kewaunee County had 15 religious organizations in the county.

Public health
According to calculations based on 2010–2014 data, children born in Kewaunee County have a life expectancy of 82.0 years, the highest out of all 72 Wisconsin counties. From 2000 to 2010, the county premature death rate of persons younger than 75 years old fell 38.3%, the greatest reduction out of all Wisconsin counties. In 2015, 89.1% of babies born in the county had a normal birth weight, compared to 92.6% for the state. The substance abuse and preventable hospitalization rates for the county were lower than for the state as a whole. Five-year ACS estimates for 2012-2016 found that Kewaunee County tied with 23 other counties in having the 675th lowest percentage of disabled residents under 65 years old out of all 3,145 US counties. 9.7% were disabled.

A CDC survey of people reporting frequent mental distress (14-30 mentally unhealthy days in the last 30 days, data aggregated over 2003–2009) found that people in Kewaunee County were more likely to be distressed than those in most Wisconsin counties, but less likely to be distressed than those in the heavily urbanized southeast portion of the state.

From 2014 through 2017 reported cases of Lyme disease increased from 0 cases in 2014 to 5 cases in 2017.

In a study of car accident data from 1992 to 2001, the risk of incurring a severe traffic injury during a stretch of driving was found to be higher in Kewaunee County than in Door County, but Kewaunee County had less fatalities per 100 people severely injured than Door County. This was thought to be due to the shorter distance it took to get people injured in Kewaunee County to treatment, as the nearest hospital with a high level of trauma certification was St. Vincent Hospital in Green Bay.

Pollution
PCBs from Green Bay have been deposited into the county as windborn dust and off of contaminated waters.

The only superfund site in the county is the former Algoma Municipal Landfill.

As of 2020, the state listed the following waters in Kewaunee County as being impaired by pollution:
Ahnapee River, Black Creek, Casco Creek, East Alaska Lake, East Twin River, Green Bay, Jambo Creek, Kewaunee River, Krok Creek,  Lake Michigan, Neshota River, Red River, School Creek, Silver Creek, and Stony Creek. Concerns varied from waterway to waterway, but included E. coli, mercury, PCBs, phosphorus, sediment levels, and high levels of suspended solids.

Between 2010 and 2018, there were 76 state-documented manure spills in the county. The likelihood of well water contamination differs depending on which area of the county the well is located, as some areas have thicker layers of soil than others. An electronic map marks the locations of every septic system and drain field, along with situations more liable to spread fecal contamination, such as areas with a shallow water table, high permeability, or likely to have karst features. A different electronic map shows the locations of private wells polluted with nitrates and other contaminants down to the section level. Another factor is tile drainage, as relatively high amounts of phosphorus were documented from water coming from two tiled sites located on a Kewaunee County farm between 2005 and 2009. The quick drainage reduces the filtration of nutrients out of the water and into the soil. The distribution of bacterial contamination in private wells has been mapped. Some bacteria found in surface water have genes for antibiotic resistance. This is thought to be due to the bovine use of antibiotics.

Radio stations
 WBDK (96.7 FM, Algoma)
 WRLU (FM 104.1, Algoma)
 WCFW (92.7 FM, Kewaunee)

Communities

Cities
 Algoma
 Kewaunee (county seat)

Villages
 Casco
 Luxemburg

Towns

 Ahnapee
 Carlton
 Casco
 Franklin
 Lincoln
 Luxemburg
 Montpelier
 Pierce
 Red River
 West Kewaunee

Census-designated places
 Dyckesville (partial)

Unincorporated communities

 Alaska
 Bay View
 Birchwood
 Bolt
 Bruemmerville
 Casco Junction
 Cherneyville
 Clyde
 Curran
 Duvall
 East Krok
 Ellisville
 Euren
 Frog Station
 Gregorville
 Kodan
 Krok
 Lincoln
 Neuren
 Norman
 Pilsen
 Rankin
 Rio Creek
 Rosiere (partial)
 Rostok
 Ryans Corner
 Slovan
 Stangelville
 Thiry Daems
 Tisch Mills (partial)
 Tonet
 Walhain

Former communities
 Black Earth

History

In 1795, Jacques Vieau established a short-lived trading post in Kewaunee.

In 1854, the first Czechs arrived, coming north from Milwaukee.

19th-century Algoma (at the time called Ahnapee) was host to a longstanding inter-ethnic economic struggle over pier pricing and access.

In 1887, an octahedrite meteorite weighing nearly nine pounds was plowed up four miles west of Algoma. It is displayed at the Geology Museum at UW–Madison.

Kewaunee and Casco Junction were connected to Green Bay in 1891 by the Kewaunee, Green Bay and Western Railroad. It later became part of the Green Bay and Western Railroad. The western portion of this line provides freight service to Luxembourg to the present day, but not further east.

The first leg of the Ahnapee and Western Railway was built in 1892.

The first Belgian Kermiss harvest festival in the nation is thought have taken place in the county.

Gallery

Politics

Notable people
For lists of notable people from Kewaunee County, see the following articles:
 Luxemburg § Notable people
 Algoma § Notable people
 Kewaunee § Notable people
 Ahnapee § Notable residents
 Carlton § Notable people
 Franklin § Notable people

See also
 National Register of Historic Places listings in Kewaunee County, Wisconsin

Notes

References

Further reading
 History of Kewaunee County. n.p., n.p., 1921–1922.

External links

 Kewaunee County
 Kewaunee County map from the Wisconsin Department of Transportation
 Northeast Wisconsin Historical County Plat Maps & Atlases University of Wisconsin Digital Collections Center
 Lengthy excerpt from Pioneers of Ahnapee detailing history from the later half of the 19th century

 
Green Bay metropolitan area
1859 establishments in Wisconsin
Populated places established in 1859